Bertia is a genus of fungi within the Bertiaceae family.

Species

Bertia antennaroidea
Bertia aparaphysata
Bertia australis
Bertia biseptata
Bertia clusiae
Bertia convolutispora
Bertia didyma
Bertia fructicola
Bertia gigantospora
Bertia haloxyli
Bertia hainanensis
Bertia italica
Bertia latispora
Bertia macrospora
Bertia massei
Bertia moriformis
Bertia ngongensis
Bertia novoguineensis
Bertia orbis
Bertia oxyspora
Bertia pulneyensis
Bertia puttemansii
Bertia querceti
Bertia quercicola
Bertia sinensis
Bertia solorinae
Bertia submoriformis
Bertia tessellata
Bertia triseptata
Bertia tropicalis
Bertia turbinata
Bertia vitis

References

External links

Sordariomycetes genera
Coronophorales